Malborough is a village located in the South Hams region of Devon. The village is located on the A381 between Kingsbridge and Salcombe, and is a popular village for tourists, with many holiday homes located around the village.

Malborough can be seen from many miles away throughout the South Hams region, due to its magnificent church spire, which is located at the highest point of the village. The Church of All Saints dates from the 13th Century and is built from local Soar stone. The Right Honourable John Stapleton de Courcy, 28th Baron Kingsale, is interred in the churchyard, with other members of the de Courcy family.

The village is home to a small co-op supermarket and a petrol station. The village has an Anglican and a Baptist church, two pubs, a large village hall and playing fields with children's play equipment and an outdoor gym, a hotel, a primary school, a post office and a football team. There is also an active youth club which runs at the Baptist Church

Historic estates
The parish of Malborough contains various historic estates including:
Yarde, the original seat of the prominent Devonshire gentry family of Yard, of which branches were later seated at Teignwick, Kingsteignton; Bradley, Kingsteignton; Whiteway, Kingsteignton; Churston Ferrers; Sharpham, Ashprington. It was later a seat of the Dyer family.

Moonraker
Malborough has a number of connections with the word "Moonraker": the village cricket club, a local taxi company and a house on the historic Lower Town are named Moonrakers. Legend has it that a consignment of brandy was landed at Hope Cove and was in the process of being brought across Bolberry Down to Malborough when the customs men were spied riding down the valley. The smugglers threw the barrels into Horsey Pool, but realised they could still be seen through the water in the moonlight, so started raking the surface of the pond. When the customs men asked what they were doing, they replied that they were trying to rake the moon out of the pond.

References

External links
 Malborough Village Website
 Malborough Baptist Church

Villages in South Hams
Civil parishes in South Hams